Francis Godolphin Henry Pelham, 7th Earl of Chichester (23 March 1905 – 22 November 1926) was a British nobleman, styled Lord Pelham from April 1905 to 1926.

He held one of the shortest tenures of an earldom on record, outliving his father, the 6th earl, by only 9 days; and was succeeded by his younger brother John, then 14 years old.

He was educated at Eton College and Trinity College, Oxford; and died of pneumonia.

References

1905 births
1926 deaths
Earls of Chichester
People educated at Eton College
Alumni of Trinity College, Oxford
Deaths from pneumonia in England
Francis
20th-century English nobility